Richard "Rich" Clarke (born 19 August 1978) is an English radio presenter and DJ from Worcester, England, currently presenting with Global.

Student radio
At Royal Holloway, University of London he co-operated with future BBC journalist Ed Harry, wrestling personality Dean Ayass, future Digital Radio industrialist Matt Deegan and fellow students to create Insanity, a student radio station in the Student Radio Association, and went on to manage Insanity for Restricted Service Licence broadcasts.

Post-graduation
After graduating, Clarke was elected on to the Executive of the Student Radio Association as a Development Officer, also attaining this position within the Radio Academy. He also worked in Greater London as a DJ and a freelance radio producer.

Career
Clarke got a break in mainstream radio when he signed to host the evening slot on CFM Radio in Carlisle. Moving from London to Cumbria, Clarke impressed station directors and was moved to the afternoon drive time. He was then offered the mid-morning slot at Wyvern FM in his home city of Worcester, presenting for two years. Clarke also regularly DJ'd at local nightclubs, often and hosted the XS concerts. A further move to Nottingham followed to host drive time on Trent FM (now Capital Midlands). This led him to meet Lucy Horobin to present Richard and Lucy. He was also the station's Deputy Programme Director, a post he had continued since working at Wyvern FM (now Free Radio Herefordshire and Worcestershire).  

In January 2006, Clarke and Horobin moved north to Manchester to present a new evening show. The show was originally given the short-lived name North West's Most Wanted and aired on Key 103 and sister station Rock FM. By this time they were known as Rich and Luce. Following its success, the programme was rebranded In:Demand and launched across the Big City Network as a Bauer Radio simulcast show across the North of England. Bauer's nationwide DAB station The Hits also took the programme. At Key 103, Clarke also hosted a Saturday lunchtime show and often covered the nationwide Hit40UK when regular presenter Lucio was absent, the first time being 24 June 2007.

Clarke joined Capital London in January 2009 to host the weeknight late slot and a Sunday evening "sorting out your problems" style show. In March 2009, he was joined by new co-presenter Kat Shoob and they presented six shows a week. Clarke has covered the Capital London's Capital Breakfast whilst Johnny Vaughan was absent in July 2009. From 3 January 2011, on the newly formed Capital network, Clarke solely presented every weeknight from 19:00 until 23:00 (excluding Friday's between December 2011 and March 2012). On 2 April 2012, he moved to the weekday mid-morning slot.

In April 2009, Clarke began presenting Hit40UK in place of Lucio, whose contract was not renewed. Hit40UK was re branded as The Vodafone Big Top 40 on 14 June 2009.

On 12 December 2013 Clarke announced he was leaving The Vodafone Big Top 40 show and the mid morning show on the Capital Network. From January 2014 onwards he co-presented the breakfast show on Heart Solent.

As of 3 June 2019 he presents weekday drivetime on Heart South and Saturday drivetime across the Heart Network.

Other activities
Clarke is a voice over artist and has voiced album campaigns. He has worked in web development with his own Trickster Media company and is a keen runner, having completed the Great North Run and the Great Manchester Run.

References

External links
Rich Clarke Official Website

1978 births
Living people
Mass media people from Worcester, England
Alumni of Royal Holloway, University of London
British radio presenters
British radio personalities
Alumni of the Student Radio Association
Capital (radio network)
English LGBT people
British LGBT broadcasters